Khan Takhti (also Romanized as Khān Takhtī and Khantakhty; also known as Khantakh) is a village in Kenarporuzh Rural District, in the Central District of Salmas County, West Azerbaijan Province, Iran. At the 2006 census, its population was 419, in 114 families.

References 

Populated places in Salmas County